Richard Mark Honeywood is a video game localization director and professional English/Japanese translator. He grew up in Australia and moved to Japan after graduating with degrees in computer science and Japanese from the University of Sydney. Honeywood initially worked for several Japanese video game developers as a programmer, but transitioned to localization after joining Square in 1997. He is credited with founding the localization department at the company which has been praised for its high-quality translations. During his tenure at Square (later Square Enix), Honeywood expanded the team's role from text translation to becoming a partner of the development team, creating localized text and graphics and ensuring that the video game code supported multiple languages easily. In 2007, Honeywood left Square Enix for Blizzard Entertainment, where he served as the global localization manager for World of Warcraft until November 2010. He then moved to be the translation director for Level-5.

Biography
Honeywood grew up in Australia and spent time in Japan as a foreign exchange student in high school. He earned degrees in computer science and Japanese at University of Sydney and spent his fourth year at its sister school, Hosei University. He began his career as a game programmer at Rise Corporation, a subsidiary of Seibu Kaihatsu. Honeywood and some members of this development team left Rise to form Digital Eden, a new company that worked on a number of Nintendo 64DD games in collaboration with HAL Laboratory. When it became clear that the 64DD's protracted development would render their efforts meaningless, Digital Eden agreed to disband without releasing a single game. Satoru Iwata, then-president of HAL Laboratory, personally offered Honeywood the opportunity to work on an early Pokémon game but he declined, instead joining Square in 1997. Originally, he was to work as a programmer on Final Fantasy VII under Ken Narita. However, the impressive sales of Final Fantasy VII in Western markets prompted Square to look into improving the quality of its translated products—Final Fantasy VII was widely criticized for its rushed translation, which had been handled entirely by Michael Baskett, the company's only in-house translator at the time. Compounding this critical staff shortage, text in the game could only be input in Shift JIS, a standard Japanese character encoding format, which was incompatible with spelling and grammar correction software. Honeywood and Aiko Ito were brought on as localization producers to recruit for a dedicated localization team within the company, which later included Alexander O. Smith. This team established best practices with respect to code preservation—localization efforts for Chocobo no Fushigi na Dungeon and Tobal 2 were halted at the gate when a complete copy of the source code could not be pieced together from the disbanded development team's computers. For Final Fantasy VIII, Honeywood had written a text parser that would automatically convert text from English ASCII to the Shift JIS format required by the game engine's compiler, streamlining the translation process dramatically.

Honeywood described Xenogears, his first translation project at Square and the first to be handled internally by the company, as "pure hell". This difficult experience catalyzed many of the changes to the company's approach to localization, moving translators' workspaces closer to the original development teams, improving communication with them, and introducing full-time editors. Another key change was adding a familiarization and glossary creation period to the schedule, in which the team develops a consistent style and characterization guide for the project. For Honeywood, a good localization takes into account the cultural differences between Japan and western territories. This sometimes involves rewriting dialogue or altering graphics, animations, and sounds. For instance, in Chocobo Racing, visual references to the Japanese folk heroes Momotarō and Kiji were changed to depict Hansel and Gretel, since the game was designed mainly for children, and Hansel and Gretel are better known in the west than Momotarō and Kiji. According to Honeywood, trying to explain to the original development teams why some changes are needed can range from "frustrating to downright hilarious". Generally, older development teams trust the translators with making changes while newer teams can be more reluctant, though they usually build up trust gradually.

During the development of Final Fantasy IX, Honeywood's team had expanded to allow translation from Japanese directly to French, Italian, German, and Spanish without English as an intermediate. He also convinced the planning team to switch to ASCII characters. It was the last main Final Fantasy title in which translation began after the game was finished. Starting with Final Fantasy X, the localization team would get involved much earlier, collaborating to create the game script. As the first main series title to feature voice acting, the team faced problems in both making the dialogue more compatible with an English-speaking audience and lip-synching it to match the in-game characters, whose lip movements were matched to the original Japanese dialogue. Honeywood spent four years working as localization director of Final Fantasy XI, translating new content concurrently with the Japanese version. For this title, he was responsible for the auto-translation feature, which allows Japanese and English speaking players of the game to communicate quickly. He also established naming conventions for the playable races and coded an automated name generator for new players. After Square merged with Enix to become Square Enix, he was tasked with managing localization for the Dragon Quest series. In order to differentiate the series from Final Fantasy, Honeywood decided to localize Dragon Quest VIII: Journey of the Cursed King and future titles in the series in British English. As part of this work, he wrote a comprehensive style guide to standardize names across the entire series, which has been maintained and updated by other teams since.

He moved to Blizzard Entertainment in 2007, serving as global localization manager for World of Warcraft from 2007 to 2010. He is the localization director for Level-5 as of 2011. For Ni no Kuni: Wrath of the White Witch, Honeywood adapted the different Japanese accents of the original script into various British accents. He pointed to a stand-up comedy routine midway through the game as a particular challenge for that project.

Works

See also
Localization of Square Enix video games
Alexander O. Smith – Honeywood's protégé at Square and Square Enix

References

External links

21st-century translators
Final Fantasy designers
Japanese–English translators
Living people
Place of birth missing (living people)
Year of birth missing (living people)
Video game localization
University of Sydney alumni